Pačejov is a municipality and village in Klatovy District in the Plzeň Region of the Czech Republic. It has about 700 inhabitants.

Administrative parts
Villages of Pačejov-nádraží, Strážovice, Týřovice and Velešice are administrative parts of Pačejov.

History
The first written mention of Pačejov is in a deed of Ottokar I of Bohemia from 1227.

According to parish records, immigrants born in Pačejov were some of the highest-represented groups of the St. Wenceslaus Church in Baltimore.

References

Villages in Klatovy District